Johann Georg Fuchs von Dornheim (1586–1633) was the Prince-Bishop of Bamberg from 1623 to 1633. He was known as the "Hexenbrenner" (witch burner) and the "Hexenbischof" (witch-bishop) for presiding over the most intensive period of witch trials in early modern Bamberg.

Biography
Johann Georg Fuchs von Dornheim was born in Wiesentheid on 23 April 1586. Johann Georg was elected Prince-Bishop of Bamberg on 13 February 1623.

Motivated by the Counter-Reformation, Johann Georg presided over the Bamberg witch trials, which lasted from 1626 to 1631. As a part of the trials, he ordered the construction of a "witch-house," a prison which featured a torture chamber adorned with Bible verses. These trials led to the execution of 300-600 individuals, the most notable of which was Bamberg burgomaster Johannes Junius.

Amid the Thirty Years' War, troops under Gustavus Adolphus of Sweden and John George I, Elector of Saxony occupied the Prince-Bishopric of Bamberg on 11 February 1632, forcing Fuchs von Dornheim to flee the city. 
He died in exile in Spital am Pyhrn, Austria on 29 March 1633.

References

1586 births
1633 deaths
Prince-Bishops of Bamberg
People from Kitzingen (district)
Bamberg witch trials